Connecticut's 20th State Senate district elects one member to the Connecticut State Senate. It consists of the communities of New London, Salem, Bozrah, East Lyme, Old Lyme, Waterford, and parts of Old Saybrook and Montville. It has been represented by Republican Paul Formica since 2015.

Recent elections

2020

2018

2016

2014

2012

References

20